David Yule (born September 4, 1974 in Vancouver, British Columbia) is a former field hockey midfielder from Canada.

Biography 

The forward is BA in English Literature and History from University of British Columbia. He co-wrote with Rick Roberts "The Goose is in Malaysia", theme song of the Men's National Team at the 1998 Commonwealth Games.  Yule played in the Dutch Premier League (Hoofdklasse) for HGC from Wassenaar.

International senior competitions
 1998 – Commonwealth Games, Kuala Lumpur (not ranked)
 1999 – Sultan Azlan Shah Cup, Kuala Lumpur (4th)

References 

1974 births
Living people
Canadian expatriate sportspeople in the Netherlands
Canadian male field hockey players
Canadian people of Scottish descent
Field hockey players from Vancouver
HGC players